Marcus was the founder of the Marcosian Gnostic sect in the 2nd century AD. He was a disciple of Valentinus, with whom his system mainly agrees. His doctrines are almost exclusively known to us through a long polemic (i. 13–21) in Adversus Haereses, in which Irenaeus gives an account of his teaching and his school. Clement of Alexandria clearly knew of Marcus and actually used his system of mystical numbers (four, six, eight, ten, twelve, thirty), though without acknowledgement.

Life
Marcus appears to have been an elder contemporary of Irenaeus, who speaks of him as though still living and teaching. Though we learn from Irenaeus that the Rhone district was a home to the followers of Marcus, it does not appear that Marcus was there himself, and the impression left is that Irenaeus knew the followers of Marcus by personal intercourse, Marcus only by his writings. We are told also of Marcus having seduced the wife of one of the deacons in Asia (διάκονον τινα τῶν ἐν τῇ Ἀσίᾳ), and the most natural conclusion is that Asia Minor was the scene where Marcus made himself a teacher, probably before Irenaeus had left that district; that it was a leading bishop there who resisted Marcus; and that his doctrines passed into Gaul by means of the extensive intercourse well known to have then prevailed between the two countries.

The use of Hebrew or Syriac names in the Marcosian school may lead us to ascribe to Marcus an Oriental origin. The only grounds, for believing him to be of Egyptian extraction are these:—Sulpicius Severus, and others who give the history of the origin of Priscillianism, tell that one Marcus of Memphis brought the Gnostic doctrines into Spain, from whom Agape and Elpidius learned them. Jerome certainly identified this Marcus with the subject of the present article, his notion being that Marcosian doctrine, which we know from Irenaeus to have been prevalent in Southern Gaul, naturally passed on to the adjacent province of Spain. It is not quite clear whether Jerome felt the chronological difficulties of his theory, which, however, could be easily got over by supposing that the first Priscillianists were to be regarded as having learned from Marcus, not because they had been taught by himself personally, but because they had learned from men who revered him as the founder of their sect. But since Priscillianism contains none of the points which distinguish Marcus from other Gnostics, it is safer to regard Marcus, of Memphis as a distinct personage.

Teachings

His system tells of 30 aeons, divided into an Ogdoad, a Decad, and a Dodecad; of the fall and recovery of Sophia; of the future union of the spirits of the chosen seed with angels as their heavenly bridegrooms. What Marcus added to the teaching of his predecessors was a system of Isopsephy similar to that of the later Pythagoreans, about mysteries in numbers and names. Marcus found in Scripture and in Nature repeated examples of the occurrence of his mystical numbers, four, six, eight, ten, twelve, thirty.

Accusations
Irenaeus alleges that Marcus abused his influence over "silly women" in order to gain both money and sexual favors. He is accused of having used philtres and love charms, and at least one, if not more, of his female disciples on returning to the Church confessed that body as well as mind had been defiled by him. However, it seems that most of his followers claimed to have been elevated by their knowledge and the redemption they had experienced.

See also
Marcosians
Colarbasians
Valentinus (Gnostic)
Valentinianism

Notes

References

Further reading

Gnostics